Eric Abrahamsen (born 1978) is an American award-winning literary translator from Chinese to English.

Biography 
Abrahamsen studied Chinese at the Central University for Nationalities in Beijing from 2001, and remained in China until 2016, translating and promoting Chinese literature. He hosts the website Paper Republic.

Awards 
 Awarded a PEN Translation Grant for his translation of Wang Xiaobo's My Spiritual Homeland.
 Awarded a NEA grant for his translation of Xu Zechen's Running Through Beijing.
 Shortlisted for the National Translation Award for his translation of Xu Zechen's Running Through Beijing.
 2015 - Awarded Special Book Award of China

Publications 
Abrahamsen has translated numerous works of varying lengths, which have been published in The New Yorker, Granta, n+1, and Paper Republic. He also writes about contemporary Chinese literature.

Translations of  Novels 
 Wang Xiaofang: The Civil Servant's Notebook (2011) 公务员笔记
 Xu Zechen: Running Through Beijing (2013) 跑步穿过中关村

Translations of Short Stories 
 A Yi: Barren Land 贫瘠之地
 A Yi: In the Penal Colony 在流放地
 Bi Feiyu: The Deluge 大雨如注
 Bi Feiyu: Wang Village and the World 地球上的王家庄
 Jiang Yitan: China Story 中国故事
 Lu Yang: Silver Tiger 银色老虎
 Lu Yang: Running Around Beijing 在北京奔跑
 Sheng Keyi: An Inexperienced World 缺乏经验的世界
 Su Tong: Watermelon Boats 西瓜船
 Wang Xiaobo: Mister Lover 舅舅情人
 Xu Zechen: A Brief History of Time 时间简史
 Xu Zechen: Outdoor Film 露天电影
 Xu Zechen: Wheels Are Round 轮子是圆的
 Xu Zechen: Visiting Dai on a Snowy Evening 雪夜访戴
 Xu Zechen: The Dog's Been Barking All Day, July, 2017 狗叫了一天
 Zhang Wei: King's Blood 王血
 Zhang Wei: Rain and Snow 下雨下雪

External links 
 Paper Republic website
 Eric Abrahamsen profile on Paper Republic
 Eric Abrahamsen profile on Words Without Borders
 Interview with Eric Abrahamsen in World Literature Today (2014)
 Interview with Eric Abrahamsen in SFWP (2015)
  Feature about Abrahamsen in the South China Morning Post (21 Nov 2021)

References 

Literary translators
Translators from Chinese
Translators to English
Chinese–English translators
Living people
American translators
1978 births